Newport is a borough in Perry County, Pennsylvania, United States. The population was 1,487 at the 2020 census. It is part of the Harrisburg–Carlisle Metropolitan Statistical Area.

History

Newport was originally known as Ryder's Ferry, as it was the site of an early ferry on the Juniata River. It was later renamed Newport after the canal came through.

Newport was the eastern end of the Newport and Shermans Valley Railroad. There was a freight yard where railcars and cargo could be transferred to standard gauge for the Pennsylvania Railroad.

Newport once had a large tannery that operated from the second half of the 19th century until the early part of the 20th. The town playground and youth baseball fields now occupy the site.

The Bridge in Newport Borough and Newport Historic District are listed on the National Register of Historic Places.

Geography

Newport is located at  (40.478260, -77.133997).

Demographics

As of the census of 2000, there were 1,506 people, 666 households, and 402 families residing in the borough. The population density was 4,604.8 people per square mile (1,762.0/km2). There were 743 housing units at an average density of 2,271.8 per square mile (869.3/km2). The racial makeup of the borough was 98.54% White, 0.13% African American, 0.33% Native American, 0.07% Asian, 0.27% from other races, and 0.66% from two or more races. Hispanic or Latino of any race were 0.66% of the population.

Of the 666 households, 29.6% had children under the age of 18 living with them, 45.3% were married couples living together, 10.4% had a female householder with no husband present, and 39.6% were non-families. 35.9% of all households were made up of individuals, and 17.6% had someone living alone who was 65 years of age or older. The average household size was 2.26 and the average family size was 2.91.

In the borough the age distribution of the population shows 25.0% under the age of 18, 7.5% from 18 to 24, 30.1% from 25 to 44, 21.8% from 45 to 64, and 15.5% who were 65 years of age or older. The median age was 36 years. For every 100 females, there were 89.7 males. For every 100 females age 18 and over, there were 83.0 males.

The median income for a household in the borough was $31,594, and the median income for a family was $39,545. Males had a median income of $31,413 versus $22,344 for females. The per capita income for the borough was $16,818. About 6.8% of families and 10.0% of the population were below the poverty line, including 10.1% of those under age 18 and 11.4% of those age 65 or over.

High school
The high school which serves the borough as well as several surrounding townships is located at the northwest corner of town, and was remodeled in 2007. Their nickname is the Buffaloes, and their field is named after George Katchmer, who coached the school to their only undefeated campaign in 1953. The field is dual purpose and is used for football and baseball....

Notable people
 Billy Cox, Major League Baseball infielder. The baseball field is named after him. He played third base for the Pittsburgh Pirates, Brooklyn Dodgers and Baltimore Orioles in the 1940s and 1950s.
 John W. Hetrick, Engineer who invented the airbag
 Thomas Markle, Lighting director and father of Meghan, Duchess of Sussex

References

External links 

 Newport PA Borough Website
 Newport Revitalization & Preservation Society
 Newport Public Library
 Newport School District site

Boroughs in Perry County, Pennsylvania
Harrisburg–Carlisle metropolitan statistical area
Populated places established in 1804
1840 establishments in Pennsylvania
Boroughs in Pennsylvania